The eastern striped bandicoot (Microperoryctes ornata) is a species of marsupial in the family Peramelidae. It is found in eastern Papua New Guinea in the Enga Province. It is endemic to mountain forested habitats ranging from 1,000 – 3,600 m in elevation. The eastern striped bandicoot is a terrestrial omnivore.

It was previously listed as a subspecies of Microperoryctes longicauda.

Description
The eastern striped bandicoot has a tail length is from 17.4 cm to 19.8 cm.

References

Further reading
 

Peramelemorphs
Mammals of Papua New Guinea
Mammals described in 1904
Taxa named by Oldfield Thomas
Marsupials of New Guinea